Nils Ole Oftebro (born ) is a Norwegian actor and illustrator. He was born in Sarpsborg. He worked for Fjernsynsteatret from 1969 to 1971. From 1971 he was assigned to Nationaltheatret. He was artistical director at Torshovteatret from 1987 to 1989. He received the Amanda Award for "Best Actor" in 1986, for his role in the television production Du kan da ikke bare gå, and in 1998 for "Best Supporting Role" in Thranes metode. Among his films are Du Pappa, Dagny and Blood of the Railroad Workers.

His dubbing work includes Jafar in Aladdin, the Grand Duke of Owls in Rock-a-Doodle, Tim Lockwood in Cloudy with a Chance of Meatballs and Stinky Pete the Prospector in Toy Story 2.

He is best known to international audiences for his appearances in the Swedish drama series Black Lake.

References

External links

1944 births
Living people
People from Sarpsborg
Norwegian male stage actors
Norwegian male film actors
Norwegian illustrators
Norwegian male voice actors
Norwegian male television actors